1354 Botha, provisional designation , is an exceptionally dark background asteroid from the outer regions of the asteroid belt, approximately 46 kilometers in diameter. It was discovered on 3 April 1935, by South-African astronomer Cyril Jackson at the Union Observatory in Johannesburg. The asteroid was named after South African prime minister Louis Botha.

Orbit and classification 

Botha is a non-family asteroid of the main belt's background population. It orbits the Sun in the outer asteroid belt at a distance of 2.4–3.8 AU once every 5 years and 6 months (2,017 days; semi-major axis of 3.12 AU). Its orbit has an eccentricity of 0.22 and an inclination of 6° with respect to the ecliptic.

Physical characteristics 

Botha is an assumed carbonaceous C-type asteroid.

Rotation period 

In September 2003, a fragmentary rotational lightcurve of Botha was obtained from photometric observations by Swiss astronomers Stefano Sposetti and Raoul Behrend. Lightcurve analysis gave a tentative rotation period of 4 hours with a brightness amplitude of 0.21 magnitude. As of 2017, no secure period has been obtained.

Diameter and albedo 

According to the surveys carried out by the Infrared Astronomical Satellite IRAS, the Japanese Akari satellite and the NEOWISE mission of NASA's Wide-field Infrared Survey Explorer, Botha measures between 38.41 and 70.34 kilometers in diameter and its surface has an albedo between 0.014 and 0.05.

The Collaborative Asteroid Lightcurve Link derives an albedo of 0.0295 and a diameter of 48.82 kilometers based on an absolute magnitude of 11.0.

Naming 

This minor planet was named after Louis Botha (1862–1919), the first Prime Minister of South Africa of the Union of South Africa, which existed between 1910 and 1961. The official  was published by the Minor Planet Center in April 1953.

References

External links 
 Asteroid Lightcurve Database (LCDB), query form (info )
 Dictionary of Minor Planet Names, Google books
 Asteroids and comets rotation curves, CdR – Observatoire de Genève, Raoul Behrend
 Discovery Circumstances: Numbered Minor Planets (1)-(5000) – Minor Planet Center
 
 

001354
Discoveries by Cyril Jackson (astronomer)
Named minor planets
19350403